Alexander Sloan Nibley  (June 23, 1908 – April 3, 1990) was an American screenwriter. He was the older brother of famed Latter Day Saint scholar Hugh Nibley.

Career
Born in Portland, Oregon to Alexander ("El") and Agnes "Sloanie" Nibley, Nibley served in the Navy in New York in 1945 before beginning his career. Nibley served as screenwriter for over twenty films including Springfield Rifle, Carson City, the remake of The Golden Stallion, and Eyes of Texas (1948), a film starring Roy Rogers. He also wrote for numerous TV series, including Sea Hunt, Sky King, Wagon Train, and The Addams Family.

Personal life and death
Nibley married actress Linda Stirling in 1946 with whom he had two children, Chris and Tim. He died on April 3, 1990, in Los Angeles, California.

Selected filmography

References

External links
 

1908 births
1990 deaths
American male screenwriters
Writers from Portland, Oregon
United States Navy sailors
American people of Scottish descent
American people of English descent
Screenwriters from Oregon
20th-century American male writers
20th-century American screenwriters